Alarm für Cobra 11 – Die Autobahnpolizei (Alarm for Cobra 11 – The Highway Police) is a long-running, popular German television series about a two-man team of highway police (Autobahnpolizei), originally set in Berlin and later in North Rhine-Westphalia. The series has been broadcast in countries worldwide.

 RTL has also announced that twenty-seven season is the last Alarm für Cobra 11 - Die Autobahnpolizei season for the time being.

Series overview

Episodes

Season 1 (1996)

Season 2 (1997)

Season 3 (1997–98)

Season 4 (1998–99)

Season 5 (1999–00)

Season 6 (2000–01)

Season 7 (2001–02)

Season 8 (2002–03)

Season 9 (2003–04)

Season 10 (2004–05)

Season 11 (2005–06)

Season 12 (2006–07)

Season 13 (2007–08)

Season 14 (2008–09)

Season 15 (2009–10)

Season 16 (2010–11)

Season 17 (2011–12)

Season 18 (2012–13)

Season 19 (2013–14)

Season 20 (2014–15)

Season 21 (2015–16)

Season 22 (2016–17)

Season 23 (2017–18)

Season 24 (2018–19)

Season 25 (2019)

Season 26 (2020−21)

Season 27 (2022)

External links
 

Alarm fur Cobra 11 - Die Autobahnpolizei